Lombardini may refer to:

 Lombardini S.r.l., Italian manufacturer of Diesel engines up to 134HP
 Maddalena Laura Lombardini (1745–1818), Italian composer, violinist, and singer, also known as Maddalena Laura Sirmen
 Manuel José María Ignacio Lombardini de la Torre (1802–1853), Mexican general and politician 
 Siro Lombardini (1924–2013), Italian economist and politician

See also
 Lombardi (disambiguation)